is a Japanese award that determines the most popular buzzwords on the Internet during a year.

This article also deals with the Anime Buzzword Award, which has been held in conjunction with the awards since 2013.

Overview 
The Internet Buzzword of the Year Award is selected annually by the online media company Gadget Tsushin Launched in 2007, candidates are solicited from the members of 2channel search,and the popular words are decided by the votes of those members. Since 2013, the "Anime Buzzword Awards" have been held only for words related to anime that aired that year.

Since the Grand Prize is held at the end of the year, words that were popular at the end of the year have a comparative advantage. Also, due to the selection method, words that were popular on 2channel and Nico Nico Douga tend to be selected. Many people may be more familiar with this award than the "New Word and Popular Word Awards" sponsored by You Can.

Award-winning terms

References 

Internet culture
Anime awards
Japanese awards